Tāmaki is a parliamentary electorate, returning one Member of Parliament to the New Zealand House of Representatives. The electorate is named after the Tamaki River that runs immediately east of the seat. The electorate is represented by Simon O'Connor, who became the National Party candidate after Allan Peachey withdrew from the 2011 election for health reasons; Peachey died before the election.

Population centres
The 1941 New Zealand census had been postponed due to World War II, so the 1946 electoral redistribution had to take ten years of population growth and movements into account. The North Island gained a further two electorates from the South Island due to faster population growth. The abolition of the country quota through the Electoral Amendment Act, 1945 reduced the number and increased the size of rural electorates. None of the existing electorates remained unchanged, 27 electorates were abolished, eight former electorates were re-established, and 19 electorates were created for the first time, including Tamaki.

Tāmaki is based around the Auckland isthmus north-eastern beach suburbs, Mission Bay, Meadowbank, Saint Heliers, Kohimarama and Glendowie; it also contains the working-class suburb of Glen Innes on its southern fringe. Tāmaki is the home of a selection of New Zealand's emblematic historical moments: Ngāti Whatua activism at Bastion Point (sparking a chain of events leading to the modern Treaty of Waitangi grievance settlement process) occurred inside the seat's boundaries, a seat at the time represented by the contentious Robert Muldoon, the Prime Minister responsible for the Crown's response to the occupation of Bastion Point. Among other Ngāti Whatua land taken through governmental application of public works legislation is Paratai Drive, once New Zealand's most expensive street. The area around Mission Bay is also home to the Savage Memorial, a huge site dedicated to the memory of former Labour Michael Joseph Savage, architect of the welfare state in New Zealand.

History

The National Party has held Tāmaki in all its various incarnations since 1960, when future Prime Minister Robert Muldoon (later Sir Robert) began his parliamentary career by ousting the Labour Party's Bob Tizard, and staying firmly in place until his self-selected departure from parliament at the end of 1991. In four elections (1972, 1975, 1978 and 1981) Bill Andersen of the Socialist Unity Party ran against him, receiving between 39 and 188 votes.

Muldoon's departure caused a by-election in 1992, where candidate Clem Simich won despite fierce competition in an environment where both major parties were out of favour with the electorate. Simich gave up his seat ahead of the 2005 election to high school principal Allan Peachey. Simich was returned to parliament from his party's list, having chosen to move from standing for one of his party's safest seats to instead contest Māngere, easily Labour's safest seat. Since 2005, Tāmaki was represented by Allan Peachey, who announced his retirement at the end of the parliamentary term in 2011 for health reasons.  Simon O'Connor was chosen by the National Party to contest the electorate in the 2011 general election.

Members of Parliament
Unless otherwise stated, all MPs terms began and ended at general elections.

Key

   

1Robert Muldoon resigned effective December 1991

List MPs
Members of Parliament elected from party lists in elections where that person also unsuccessfully contested the Tāmaki electorate. Unless otherwise stated, all MPs terms began and ended at general elections.

Election results

2020 election

2017 election

2014 election

2011 election

Electorate (as at 26 November 2011): 49,080

2008 election

2005 election

1999 election
Refer to Candidates in the New Zealand general election 1999 by electorate#Tamaki for a list of candidates.

1993 election

1992 by-election

1 Alliance vote increase over 3,556 combined vote for Green Party, New Labour and Democrats in 1990 election.
2 Based on 1990 election figures.

1990 election

1987 election

1984 election

1981 election

1978 election

1975 election

1972 election

1969 election

1966 election

1963 election

1960 election

1957 election

1954 election

1951 election

1949 election

1946 election

Notes

References

External links
Electorate Profile  Parliamentary Library

New Zealand electorates in the Auckland Region
Politics of the Auckland Region
1946 establishments in New Zealand